Scott MacGregor (1914–1971) was a British art director. He was originally a designer on theatrical productions before moving into film. In 1969 he was appointed head of production design at Hammer Films, replacing Bernard Robinson.

Selected filmography
 Before I Wake (1955)
 Fire Maidens from Outer Space (1956)
 Jet Storm (1959)
 Don't Panic Chaps (1959)
 The Day They Robbed the Bank of England (1960)
 Oscar Wilde (1960)
 Doctor Blood's Coffin (1961)
 The Man Who Finally Died (1963)
 I've Gotta Horse (1965)
 The Frozen Dead (1966)
 Five Golden Dragons (1967)
 The Limbo Line (1968)
 Baby Love (1968)
 Taste the Blood of Dracula (1970)
 The Vampire Lovers (1970)
 Scars of Dracula (1970)
 The Horror of Frankenstein (1970)
 Burke & Hare (1971)
 Blood from the Mummy's Tomb (1971)
 On the Buses (1971)
 Mutiny on the Buses (1972)
 Vampire Circus (1972)

References

Bibliography 
 David Huckvale. Hammer Films' Psychological Thrillers, 1950-1972. McFarland, 2014.

External links 
 

1914 births
1971 deaths
British art directors
Film people from Edinburgh